Arctic Village Airport  is a public use airport located one nautical mile (1.8 km) southwest of the central business district of Arctic Village, a Native American village in the Yukon-Koyukuk Census Area of the U.S. state of Alaska. It is owned by the Venetie Tribal Government.

Facilities and aircraft 
Arctic Village Airport has one runway designated 2/20 with a gravel surface measuring 4,500 by 75 feet (1,372 x 23 m). For the 12-month period ending December 31, 2005, the airport had 1,627 aircraft operations, an average of 135 per month: 89% air taxi and 11% general aviation.

Airlines and destinations 

The following airlines offer scheduled passenger service at this airport:

Statistics

References

External links
 FAA Alaska airport diagram (GIF)
 

Airports in the Yukon–Koyukuk Census Area, Alaska
Airports in the Arctic
Native American airports